Richard Wixon (born 19 February 1957) is a New Zealand former cricketer. He played first-class and List A matches for Central Districts and Otago between 1991 and 1995.

See also
 List of Otago representative cricketers

References

External links
 

1957 births
Living people
New Zealand cricketers
Central Districts cricketers
Otago cricketers
People from Bluff, New Zealand